Imay-Utarovo (İmay-Utar) is a rural locality (a selo) in Moskovsky Selsoviet, Dyurtyulinsky District, Bashkortostan, Russia. The population was 325 as of 2010. There are 7 streets.

Geography 
Imay-Utarovo is located 31 km southeast of Dyurtyuli (the district's administrative centre) by road. Kukkuyanovo is the nearest rural locality.

References 

Rural localities in Dyurtyulinsky District